Putnok is a town in Borsod-Abaúj-Zemplén county, Northern Hungary.

History
The area has been inhabited since Neolithic times. Until 1283 it was royal property, part (later centre) of the Gömör estate. In 1283 King László IV gave it to the Rátolth family (later: Putnoky family.) The family did much for the development of the town, but after the death of the dynasty founder Miklós a family feud began, and the inhabitants of the town and their other estates suffered a lot.

The Putnoky family had the castle of Putnok built between 1412 and 1427. During the Turkish occupation of Hungary the castle was destroyed, and in 1834 a manor house was built in its place. The town developed a lot in the 19th century, but it lost its town status in 1881.

After World War I, in 1920 the Treaty of Trianon was signed. 92% of Gömör-Kishont county was ceded to newly formed Czechoslovakia. Only its south-eastern ends, including Putnok, remained in Hungary. Being the largest village of what remained of the county, Putnok became its center. Soon enough, this small county was merged with neighbouring Borsod county, forming Borsod-Gömör-Kishont and after 1950 Borsod-Abaúj-Zemplén. Putnok lost its importance, in many senses its role was taken over by Ózd, still it got its town status back on March 1, 1989.

Tourist sights
 Gömör Museum
 László Holló Gallery

Twin towns — sister cities

Putnok is twinned with:
 Fécamp, France
 Ludgeřovice, Czech Republic
 Nowy Żmigród, Poland
 Tisovec, Slovakia
 Tornaľa, Slovakia

References

External links

  in Hungarian

Populated places in Borsod-Abaúj-Zemplén County